The following outline is provided as an overview of and topical guide to Naples:

Naples – capital of the Italian region Campania and the third-largest municipality in Italy. Naples is one of the oldest continuously inhabited cities in the world. Naples has the fourth-largest urban economy in Italy, after Milan, Rome and Turin. It is the world's 103rd-richest city by purchasing power, with an estimated 2011 GDP of US$83.6 billion. The port of Naples is one of the most important in Europe, and has the world's second-highest level of passenger flow, after the port of Hong Kong.

General reference 

 Common English name(s): Naples
 Official English name(s): City of Naples
 Adjectival(s): Neapolitan
 Demonym(s): Neapolitan

Geography of Naples 

Geography of Naples
 Naples is:
 a city
 Capital of Campania
 Capital of the Metropolitan City of Naples
 Population of Naples: 970,185
 Area of Naples:  
 Atlas of Naples

Location of Naples 

 Naples is situated within the following regions:
 Northern Hemisphere and Eastern Hemisphere
 Eurasia
 Europe (outline)
 Western Europe
 Southern Europe
 Italian Peninsula
 Italy (outline)
 Southern Italy
 Campania
 Metropolitan City of Naples
 Time zone(s): Central European Time (UTC+01), Central European Summer Time (UTC+02)

Environment of Naples 

 Climate of Naples

Landforms of Naples 
Islands of Naples
Campanian Archipelago
Phlegraean Islands

Areas of Naples

Municipalities of Naples 

Municipalities of Naples – the 10 administrative divisions (boroughs) into which Naples is divided.
 1st municipality of Naples
 2nd municipality of Naples
 3rd municipality of Naples
 4th municipality of Naples
 5th municipality of Naples
 6th municipality of Naples
 7th municipality of Naples
 8th municipality of Naples
 9th municipality of Naples
 10th municipality of Naples

Neighborhoods in Naples 

Neighborhoods in Naples (Quarters)

Locations in Naples

Parks and zoos in Naples 
Villa Comunale
Parco Virgiliano
Parco Virgiliano (Mergellina)
Botanical Garden
Villa Floridiana
Zoo di Napoli

Historic locations in Naples

Demographics of Naples 
Demographics of Naples

Government and politics of Naples 
Government and politics of Naples
 Government of Naples
 List of mayors of Naples

History of Naples 
History of Naples

 List of viceroys of Naples, Duke of Naples, List of monarchs of Naples

 Timeline of Naples
 
 Bombing of Naples in World War II

History of Naples, by period
 Timeline of Naples

History of Naples, by subject 

 Siege of Naples

Culture of Naples 

Culture of Naples
 Architecture of Naples, 
 List of tallest buildings in Naples
 List of villas in Naples
 
 
 
 Churches in Naples
 
 
 
 

 Cuisine of Naples
 Museums in Naples
 Historic Centre of Naples
 
 Early theatres in Naples
 
 Symbols of Naples
 Flag of Naples
Coat of arms of Naples

Art in Naples 

 State Archives of Naples

Cinema of Naples 

 Cinema of Naples

Music of Naples 

 Music of Naples
 Canzone Napoletana
 Neapolitan School
 List of radio stations in Naples

Religion in Naples 
 Christianity in Naples
 Bishop of Naples
 Diocese of Naples
 Catholicism in Naples
 Roman Catholic Archdiocese of Naples
 Judaism in Naples
 History of the Jews in Naples

Economy and infrastructure of Naples 

 Public services in Naples
 Naples Police Department

Transportation in Naples 

Transport in Naples
 Rail transit in Naples
 Naples subway
 List of Naples Metro stations
 Art Stations of the Naples Metro
 Port of Naples

Education in Naples 

Education in Naples
 Public education in Naples
 Universities in Naples
 University of Naples

See also 

 Outline of geography

References

External links 

Naples
Naples